Nelonen may refer to:

 Nelonen (TV channel), a Finnish television station
 Nelonen (football), the fifth level in the Finnish football league system 
 Nelonen Media, a Finnish commercial broadcasting company